Ian Cheney is an American documentary filmmaker, cinematographer, and producer.

Early life and education
Cheney grew up in Massachusetts and Maine, attended The Mountain School, a semester school for high school juniors, and graduated from Milton Academy in 1998. Cheney received bachelor's and master's degrees from Yale University in 2002 and 2003.

Career
He shared a Peabody Award in 2008 for King Corn, which he co-produced and starred in. In 2011 he and longtime collaborator Curt Ellis received the 17th Annual Heinz Award with special focus on the environment, becoming the youngest recipients to receive the Heinz Award. Cheney received an Emmy nomination in 2013 for his film The City Dark, which aired on PBS' POV.

Cheney's 2018 film, The Most Unknown, was released in theaters in May, then on Netflix in 25 languages in the summer, and finally posted in nine individual episodes in YouTube.

Cheney runs Wicked Delicate Films, a documentary film production company based in Maine. He is a co-founder and former member of the board of directors of the FoodCorps non-profit organization. He is the brother of poet Colin Cheney.

His most recent film The Long Coast premiered at a virtual version of the Camden International Film Festival in October 2020.

Filmography
King Corn (2007), Co-creator, Co-producer, Cinematographer, Writer
The Greening of Southie (2009), Director, Editor
Truck Farm (2011), Director
The City Dark (2012), Director
The Melungeons (2013), Director
The Search for General Tso (2014), Director
Bluespace (2015), Director  
The Smog of the Sea (2017), Director
The Most Unknown (2018), Director 
The Emoji Story (2019), Director  
Thirteen Ways (2019), Director  
Picture a Scientist (2020), Director  
The Long Coast (2020), Director

References

External links

Living people
Year of birth missing (living people)
American documentary filmmakers
American film producers
American cinematographers
Peabody Award winners
Yale University alumni
Milton Academy alumni